The A1071 road is  long and runs from the A134 near Sudbury to Ipswich.

Route
It by-passes Boxford, Calais Street, Bower House Tye, Hadleigh Heath, Hadleigh, where it comes to a staggered junction for the A1141 road (left) and the B1070 (right) and goes through Hintlesham. Then it comes to a T-Junction at the A1214 road (London Road) at Chantry. Then the A1214 turns into the A1071 again after the River Orwell and runs into the centre of Ipswich.

Sources 

Roads in England